USS Fortitude (AMc-81) was an Accentor-class coastal minesweeper acquired by the U.S. Navy for the task of removing mines from minefields laid in the water to prevent ships from passing.

World War II service 

Fortitude was constructed as an Accentor-class coastal minesweeper just prior to World War II. She was assigned as USS Fortitude (AMc-81) on 17 May 1941.

Reclassified as a dive tender 

However, on 20 April 1942, prior to completion as a coastal minesweeper, she was reclassified USS YDT-2, a dive tender, and the name “Fortitude” was canceled.

Deactivation 

Sold 31 January 1950

References

External links 
 NavSource Online: Mine Warfare Vessel Photo Archive - Fortitude (AMc 81) - YDT-2

 

Accentor-class minesweepers
World War II minesweepers of the United States
1941 ships